In August and September 2022, Leicester, England, saw a period of religious and ethnic tension between predominately British-Pakistani Muslims and British-Indian Hindus. The unrest saw escalated ethnic violence both populations. A singular cause of the unrest remains unclear. Community leaders and analysts point to the 28 August 2022 Asia Cup match between Pakistan and India, which saw a reaction from Pakistani fans to India's victory, as a catalyst.

Background 
Like most British cities, Leicester has significant and growing South Asian British populations. Leicester is known for its diversity, and is one of three cities in England where the White British population are a minority. Since the end of the Second World War, the city has welcomed successive waves of migration, with immigrants from the Indian sub-continent arriving in the 1960s, followed by Asians arriving from Kenya and Uganda in the early 1970s. By 2011, the Asian population of Leicester stood at 37.13%, with the city having notable Muslim and Hindu communities, at 18.63% and 15.19% respectively. With decades of history between Muslims and Hindus, originating back to colonialism and the Partition of India, the close proximity between the two growing populations is thought to have contributed to problems relating to community cohesion. With eastern Leicester known for its large Asian community, Muslims predominantly live in Spinney Hills, while Hindus mainly live in the nearby Saint Matthews and Belgrave area. Similar violence erupted in May 1997 between Muslim and Sikhs in the Asian heavy town of Slough, with Sikh youth using hammers and rocks to attack Muslim homes.

According to Leicester East MP Claudia Webbe, friction between the two communities have been "simmering for months". Hindus festivals were attacked and eggs thrown at a Hindu procession, preplanned riots/arson were planned and info about Hindu homes, businesses were shared online by Muslim gangs to be attacked, while Hindus see provocative and aggressive actions by Muslim youths, the spread of Islamist extremism within British society as contributing to the eruption in violence.

Flashpoint 
Community leaders, analysts and journalists have pointed to the aftermath of the Asia Cup cricket match between India and Pakistan on August 28, 2022 as a key flashpoint for the ongoing violence. Media reports and Guardian journalist Sunny Hundal described Hindu youths chanting nationalist slogans connected to the Hindutva movement HSS including Jai Shri Ram and "Pakistan murabad" (Death to Pakistan) in the Belgrave area on the night of August 28th after India's victory in the cricket match. Journalist Sunny Hundal noted the longstanding tensions and eruption caught the police "flatfooted".

Unrest 

In the days that followed, violence would erupt between the city's Muslims and Hindus. On the night of Sunday September 3rd, unverified video footage spread on social media, reportedly showing a mob of British Pakistanis vandalizing Hindu homes and cars, screaming "Allahu Akbar," "Long Live Pakistan," and "Modi is a dog". Police patrols were increased in eastern Leicester and both Hindu and Muslim community leaders appealed for calm, to little avail.

Numerous videos from the night of September 7th showed tensions escalating to violent fights between Muslim and Hindus, with witnesses allegedly noting knives were used in the vandalism of Hindu cars.

The violence would further escalate significantly on the weekend before the funeral of Queen Elizabeth II. On Saturday September 17, 2022, video showing large groups of Hindu youths chanting "Jai Shri Ram", walking on Green Lane Road in Spinney Hills. Widespread reports of fighting between Muslims and Hindus was reported in east Leicester on September 18th, as video footage showed balaclava clad Muslim and Hindu young men fighting on the corner of Bridge Road and Green Lane Road, with police struggling to regain control. The night of September 18th, video showed mask clad Muslims reportedly trying to burn a Hindu flag near the Shivalaya temple on Belgrave Road. 

Tensions would continue into the following week, with the unrest spreading from Leicester to the Birmingham area on Tuesday September 20th. Video footage showed nearly 200 Muslim men attempt to surround the Durga Bhawan Temple in Smethwick, a town where almost one-in-four residents are Asian, chanting "Allahu Akbar" in voicing their anger at the temple inviting the controversial Hindutva proponent, Sadhvi Rithambra, as a guest speaker, with one video showing a masked man with a Birmingham accent say "RSS speakers are not welcome in Birmingham, not welcome anywhere in the UK. None of your speakers, any of the hate speakers, we are going to turn up for all of them...we've got no issues with British Hindus, we grew up with them, we know all of them. But RSS, you'll be met by us every single time".

Reactions 
The surge in violence took many by surprise, and senior representatives of Leicester's Muslim and Hindu communities urged calm. On Tuesday September 20th, President of the Iskcon Leicester Hindu Temple, Pradip Gajjar, said he was "saddened and heartbroken to see the eruption of tension and violence."

Labour MP Jonathan Ashworth critiqued the events as "shocking scenes of unacceptable incidents of violence," and that all "are united in calling for calm, peace and harmony."

Leicester East MP Claudia Webbe has called for cooler heads to prevail, urging strengthened "dialogue to repair community relations", while warning the violence "has the potential to spread to other areas...and has the potential to spread across the country".

Rob Nixon, Acting Chief Police Constable for Leicestershire, has noted the investigation into the unrest will run for "several months" and that "the traditional community leaders, partners […] having a really detailed dialogue about some of these tensions, how we've got to where we are, and how we resolve them and take the issues forward."

See also 

 South Asian British
 British Muslims
 British Hindus
 India–Pakistan relations
 Urban riots

References 

2022 riots
Riots and civil disorder in the United Kingdom
Hindu nationalism
Pakistani nationalism
Anti-Muslim violence in Europe
Anti-Hindu violence
Leicester
Islamic nationalism